Hanford Langdon King Jr. (September 18, 1921 – October 11, 1986) was bishop of the Episcopal Diocese of Idaho from 1972 to 1982.

Early life and education
King was born on September 18, 1921 in Worcester, Massachusetts, the son of Hanford Langdon King and Hephizibah Vernon Hopkins. In 1943 he graduated with a Bachelor of Arts from Clark University. He also studied at the Episcopal Theological Seminary from where he graduated with a Bachelor of Sacred Theology in 1946. He received his Doctor of Philosophy from Columbia University in 1950.

Priest
King was ordained deacon in July 1946 after which he served as assistant of St James' Church in New York City. In March 1947, he was ordained priest and became rector of the Church of the Mediator in the Bronx,  post he retained till 1950. In 1951 he became rector of St James' Church in Bozeman, Montana and in 1960 he transferred to Rapid City, South Dakota to become rector of Emmanuel Church. He also served as a deputy to General Convention between 1958 and 1964 and in 1970.

Bishop
King was elected Bishop of Idaho on January 8, 1972. He was consecrated on May 3, 1972 by Presiding Bishop John E. Hines. He retained that post till 1981. King died a few years later on October 11, 1986.

Personal life
King married Helen Rosendahl Knospe on May 31, 1947 and together has had three children. In 1962, King was certified as a professional ski instructor.

References 
Bishops Stokes, King Mourned In Dioceses

1921 births
1986 deaths
Episcopal bishops of Idaho
20th-century American Episcopalians
People from Worcester, Massachusetts
Clark University alumni
Episcopal Divinity School alumni
Columbia University alumni
20th-century American clergy